The countries and territories included in the following list are:

East Asia
China
Hong Kong
Macau
Japan
North Korea
South Korea
Mongolia
Taiwan

South Asia
Afghanistan
Bangladesh
Bhutan
British Indian Ocean Territory
India
Maldives
Nepal
Pakistan
Sri Lanka

Southeast Asia
Brunei
Cambodia
Christmas Island
Cocos (Keeling) Islands
East Timor
Indonesia
Laos
Malaysia
Myanmar 
Philippines
Singapore
Thailand
Vietnam

Largest Megalopolis areas

Largest metropolitan areas

Largest urban areas ranked by 2010 population

Sources
A: National census authority data.
B: Demographia land area estimate based upon map or satellite photograph analysis.
C: Demographia population "build up" from third, fourth or fifth order jurisdictions (NUTS-3, NUTS-4, NUTS-5 or equivalent).
D: Population estimate based upon United Nations agglomeration estimate.
E: Demographia population estimate from national census authority agglomeration data.
F: Other Demographia population estimate.
G: Estimate based upon projected growth rate from last census.
H: Combination of adjacent national census authority agglomerations.

Largest urban agglomerations by population

Largest cities proper by population

See also
Administrative divisions of the People's Republic of China
List of cities in the People's Republic of China by population
List of cities in the People's Republic of China by GDP per capita
List of metropolitan areas in Taiwan
List of Taiwanese counties and cities by population
List of metropolitan areas by population
Cities of South Korea
Cities of North Korea
List of Japanese cities by population

Notes and references

East Asia, List of cities
Far East